Year 1448 (MCDXLVIII) was a leap year starting on Monday (link will display the full calendar) of the Julian calendar.

Events 
 January–December 
 January 6 – Christopher of Bavaria, King of Denmark, Norway and Sweden, dies with no designated heir, leaving all three kingdoms with vacant thrones. Brothers Bengt Jönsson Oxenstierna and Nils Jönsson Oxenstierna are selected to serve as co-regents of Sweden.
 August 14 – Battle of Oronichea: Albania is victorious over Venice.  
 June 20 – The Regency period of Sweden ends with the election of Karl Knutsson Bonde, as King Charles VIII of Sweden.
 June 28 – Charles VIII of Sweden is publicly hailed as king at Mora Stones, and is crowned in Uppsala Cathedral the following day.
 September 28 – Christian of Oldenburg, betrothed to Queen Dowager Dorothea of Brandenburg, becomes King Christian I of Denmark.
 October 4 – Peace between Albania and Venice is established. 
 October 17 – Battle of Kosovo: Hungarian forces under John Hunyadi are defeated by the Turks, due to Ottoman superiority.
 December 20 – Pope Nicholas V appoints Rudolf of Diepholt, Bishop of Utrecht, as cardinal.
 December – Jonas, a Russian bishop, is installed by the Council of Russian Bishops in Moscow, as Metropolitan of Kiev and All Rus; as this is without the consent of the Patriarch of Constantinople, it signifies the beginning of an effectively independent church structure in the Grand Duchy of Moscow.

 Date unknown 
 Queens' College, Cambridge is founded by Margaret of Anjou.
 The Vatican Library is founded by Pope Nicholas V.
 Vlad III the Impaler becomes reigning Prince of Wallachia for two months, before being deposed by Vladislav II of Wallachia.
 After a long episode of drought, flood, locust infestation, and famine in Ming Dynasty China since the year 1434, these natural afflictions finally wane, and agriculture and commerce return to a state of normality.
 Roman II flees to Poland, when an army sent by John Hunyadi, and led by Csupor de Monoszló, comes to put Petru on the throne of Moldavia. Petru dies suddenly, and Csupor takes on the throne for two months, as Ciubăr Vodă.

Births 
 February 14 – Nannina de' Medici, Florentine member of the de' Medici family (d. 1493)
 March 20 – Marie of Savoy, Countess of Saint-Pol, Luxembourgian noble (d. 1475)
 July 14 – Philip, Elector Palatine (d. 1508)
 September 7 – Henry, Count of Württemberg-Montbéliard (1473–1482) (d. 1519)
 October 31 – Władysław II of Płock, Polish noble (d. 1462)
 November 4 – King Alphonso II of Naples (d. 1495)
 December 12 – John Talbot, 3rd Earl of Shrewsbury, English Earl (d. 1473)
 date unknown
Baeda Maryam of Ethiopia (d. 1478)
 Nicholas I, Duke of Lorraine (d. 1473)
 Suor Barbara Ragnoni, Italian painter (d. 1533)

Deaths 
 January 6 – Christopher of Bavaria, King of Denmark, Norway and Sweden (b. 1418)
 June 18 – Elizabeth de Beauchamp, Baroness Bergavenny, English baroness (b. 1415)
 September 23 – Adolph I, Duke of Cleves (b. 1373)
October – Carlo II Tocco, ruler of Epirus
 October 12 – Zhu Quan, Prince of Ning, Chinese military commander, historian and playwright (b. 1378)
 October 31 – John VIII Palaeologus, Byzantine Emperor (b. 1390)
 date unknown
 Petru III of Moldavia

References